Aetna is a hamlet in southern Alberta, Canada within Cardston County, located  east of Highway 2, approximately  southwest of Lethbridge.

Settlement of the Aetna area began in 1888. Until 1893, the area was known as Snake Creek. In 1893 the community was named after Mount Etna by John W. Taylor, apostle for the Church of Jesus Christ of Latter-day Saints, who said a nearby hill resembled the Sicilian mountain.

Demographics 

See also 
List of communities in Alberta
List of hamlets in Alberta

References 

Cardston County
Designated places in Alberta
Hamlets in Alberta